St. John's is the largest city and metropolis in Newfoundland and Labrador with a population of 192,326. The tallest building in the city is the 11-storey,  Confederation Building. The majority of the high-rises in the city are in the downtown area, however Confederation building is located outside of the downtown. The tallest building downtown is the  John Cabot Place, with 13 floors.

Due to strict height regulations in the downtown area, the city has seen very few high-rises built in comparison to other cities of similar size. In 2010 the city amended height regulation for a small area of Water Street to allow for higher density buildings.

Tallest buildings
This list ranks buildings in St. John's that stand at least 30 metres (98 ft) tall, based on CTBUH height measurement standards. This includes spires and architectural details but does not include antenna masts.

Tallest under construction or proposed

See also

 List of tallest buildings in Atlantic Canada
 Architecture of St. John's, Newfoundland and Labrador
 Canadian Centre for Architecture
 Canadian architecture
 Downtown St. John's
 Society of Architectural Historians

References

St. John's

Tallest buildings in St. John's